William Bailey Avery (September 10, 1840 – July 19, 1894) was an American soldier who received the Medal of Honor for valor during the American Civil War.

Biography
Avery served in the American Civil War in the 1st New York Marine Artillery for the Union Army. He received the Medal of Honor on September 2, 1893 for his bravery at the Battle of Tranter's Creek.  He was a Companion of the Military Order of the Loyal Legion of the United States.

Medal of Honor citation
Citation:

Handled his battery with greatest coolness amidst the hottest fire.

See also

List of American Civil War Medal of Honor recipients: A–F

References

External links
 

Military Times

1840 births
1894 deaths
Union Army officers
United States Army Medal of Honor recipients
People of Rhode Island in the American Civil War
American Civil War recipients of the Medal of Honor
Burials at North Burying Ground (Providence)
People from Providence, Rhode Island